Abshineh (also Romanized as Ābshīneh) is a village in Sangestan Rural District, in the Central District of Hamadan County, Hamadan Province, Iran. At the 2006 census, its population was 1,356, in 372 families.

The name Ābshīneh is derived from Western Middle Iranian *āp-šēnag, which ultimately comes from Proto-Iranian *āp- + *xšaina- + *-ka-. The first element means "water", and the second means "shiny". Thus, the name Ābshīneh originally meant "a place where the water shines".

References 

Populated places in Hamadan County